Tissemsilt is a district in Tissemsilt Province, Algeria. It was named after its capital, Tissemsilt, which is also the capital of the province.

Municipalities
The district is further divided into 2 municipalities:
Tissemsilt
Ouled Bessem 

Districts of Tissemsilt Province